The Capivara Dam is an embankment dam on the Paranapanema River about  north of Porecatu, PR in Brazil. It is located along the border of the state of São Paulo to the north and the state of Paraná to the south. It was constructed between 1971 and 1978 for the primary purpose of hydroelectric power generation. The dam's first generator was commissioned in 1977. It is operated by Duke Energy Generation Paranapanema International.

See also

List of reservoirs by surface area

References

Energy infrastructure completed in 1977
Dams completed in 1978
Dams in Paraná (state)
Hydroelectric power stations in Brazil